The Duenna is an English-language opera in three acts by Robert Gerhard to libretto by the composer, after the 1775 comedy The Duenna by Richard Brinsley Sheridan. Composed 1945–47, the opera was premiered on BBC radio in 1949, and received well. It was revised in 1951 for performance at the ISCM Festival in Wiesbaden, but there the use of popular melodies did not go down well with critics. The opera is in part atonal, following Gerhard's teacher Schoenberg. It was staged, in English, in 1992 at Teatro de la Zarzuela, Madrid, and Gran Teatre del Liceu, Barcelona.

Recording
La Dueña (in English) Ann Taylor (mezzo-soprano), Richard Van Allan (bass-baritone), Neill Archer (tenor), Susannah Glanville (soprano), Eric Roberts (baritone), Bruce Budd (baritone), David Owen-Lewis (narrator), Paul Wade (tenor), Stephen Briggs (tenor), Adrian Clarke (bass), Claire Powell (mezzo-soprano), Jeremy Peaker (narrator), Deborah Pearce (narrator), Denise Mulholland (soprano) Opera North Chorus, English Northern Philharmonia, Antoni Ros-Marba Chandos 2CD  2013 2 hours 28 minutes

References

Operas
1947 operas
English-language operas
Operas set in Spain
Operas based on plays
Compositions by Robert Gerhard